Brevican core protein is a protein that in humans is encoded by the BCAN gene. Brevican is a member of the lectican protein family.

Brevican is localised to the surface of neurons in the brain. In melanocytic cells, BCAN gene expression may be regulated by MITF.

References

Further reading

External links
 

C-type lectins
Lecticans
Extracellular matrix proteins